Virgin Radio Turkey was launched in 2008 Doğuş Media Group. In 2013, the license for Virgin Radio Turkey was acquired by Karnaval Media Group, a portfolio company of Çukurova Group, a private equity fund in Turkey. As of 2013, Virgin Radio Turkey continues broadcasting under Anadolu Group.

In 2019 Virgin Radio Turkey changed their music format to predominantly Turkish hits of Rap, Hip hop and R&B.

DJs and Hosts 

 Şafak Sezer
 Beyazıt Öztürk
 Pascal Nouma
 Nihat Doğan

References

External links 

  

Radio stations established in 2008
Radio stations in Turkey
Virgin Radio
Doğuş Group
Sarıyer